Campbell ("Cam") Kennedy is a Scottish comics artist.  He is best known for his work on 2000 AD, especially the flagship titles Judge Dredd and Rogue Trooper.

Biography

Following work in commercial art in his hometown of Glasgow, Kennedy went freelance and worked as an illustrator on D.C. Thomson's Commando, a well-known British war comic, between 1967 and 1972, before leaving comics altogether to become a professional fine artist. Kennedy's work has been described as gritty, energetic, chunky and raw.

In 1978 he was lured back to comics work again, beginning by drawing the Fighting Mann (1980-81) strip for Fleetway Publications' Battle comic.  As Battle began to wind down, Kennedy moved across to its stablemate, the weekly sci-fi anthology comic 2000 AD

Working during the title's "Golden Era", Kennedy was instrumental in several well-known strips that continue to this day, including The V.C.s (written by Gerry Finley-Day, Judge Dredd (with John Wagner and Alan Grant, most notably on the "Midnight Surfer" story which reintroduced Chopper) and Rogue Trooper (again with Finley-Day).  His association with the comic, which is largely produced by fellow Scotsmen, has never faltered: in 2005, Kennedy designed and produced a brand new strip, Zancudo, written by Simon Spurrier for the Judge Dredd Megazine, and Wagner has written three stories about character Kenny Who?, an alter-ego for Kennedy, based on Kennedy's early problems getting work at American companies (as well as making jokes on issues like creator's rights and censorship).

In America, Kennedy established a profitable working relationship with writer Tom Veitch, producing the creator-owned Vietnam War-inspired science fiction fantasy The Light and Darkness War for Marvel Comics' Epic imprint. This led to the pair working on a Star Wars spin-off, Dark Empire, for Dark Horse Comics. Kennedy has worked on other Star Wars licensed comics, including Boba Fett stories with writer John Wagner. For DC Comics Kennedy has worked on Lobo, Batman, Outcasts and The Spectre. For Marvel, he has illustrated the Punisher, Daredevil and Nick Fury, Agent of S.H.I.E.L.D.

As part of the UNESCO City of Literature in 2007 he has drawn Kidnapped, an adaptation of Robert Louis Stevenson's Kidnapped, written by Alan Grant, published by Waverley Books. Some of the art for this has been bought for the collections of the National Library of Scotland.

A follow-up has been made by the same creative team, it is an adaptation of Jekyll and Hyde and was as part of the One Book – One Edinburgh 2008 campaign.

Bibliography

2000 AD / Judge Dredd Megazine / Warrior
The V.C.s (in 2000 AD # 142–143, 146–147, 150–153, 156–160, 163–164 & 169, 1979–80)
Rogue Trooper (in 2000 AD # 265, 278–281, 290–301, 303–310, 316–322 & 327–332, 1982–83)
Ektryn (in Warrior # 14, 1983)
Judge Dredd (in 2000 AD # 342, 1983)
Rogue Trooper (in 2000 AD # 343–347, 350–355, 358–364, 366–377 & 381–392, 1983–84)
Ektryn (in Warrior # 25, 1984)
Rogue Trooper (in 2000 AD # 401–406, 1985)
Judge Dredd (in 2000 AD # 416–418 & 424–429, 1985)
Rogue Trooper (in 1986 2000 AD Annual, 1985)
Judge Dredd (in 2000 AD # 435, 437 & 440–41, 1985)
Judge Dredd (in 2000 AD # 451–455, 458, 461–463, 466–467 & 477–479, 1986)
Judge Dredd (in 2000 AD # 507–510, 514 & 520, 1987)
Judge Dredd: Beyond Our Kenny (in Judge Dredd Megazine vol.1 # 1–3, 1990)
Judge Dredd (in Judge Dredd Megazine vol.3 # 46 & 50, 1998–99)
Zancudo (with Simon Spurrier, in Judge Dredd Megazine #231–233, 2005)

Dark Horse

Star Wars:
Dark Empire (with Tom Veitch):
Dark Empire (six-issue mini-series, 1991–1992, trade paperback, 1993)
Dark Empire II (six-issue mini-series, 1994, trade paperback, 1995)
Boba Fett:
Death, Lies, & Treachery (with John Wagner, Dark Horse Comics, 1998) collects:
 "Bounty on Bar-Kooda" (one-shot, 1995)
 "When the Fat Lady Swings" (one-shot, 1996)
 "Murder Most Foul" (one-shot, 1997)
 "Agent of Doom" (with John Ostrander, one-shot, 2000)
 "Sacrifice" (with John Wagner, in Empire No. 7, 2003, collected in Boba Fett: Man With A Mission, Dark Horse, March 2007)

DC Comics
Outcasts (with John Wagner/Alan Grant, 1987)
The Spectre #7–8: "Armed against Evil" (with Doug Moench, 1987)
Batman #477–478: "A Gotham Tale" (with John Wagner, 1992)
Lobo: "Unamerican Gladiators" (with Alan Grant/John Wagner, 4-issue mini-series, 1993)
Batman/Judge Dredd: Vendetta in Gotham (with John Wagner/Alan Grant DC / Fleetway, 1995)
War Story: "The Reivers" (with Garth Ennis, Vertigo, standalone one shot, 2003, collected in War Stories: Volume 2, 2006 )

Marvel Comics
The Light and Darkness War (with Tom Veitch, 1988)
Punisher: "Blood on the Moors" (with John Wagner/Alan Grant, 1987)
Punisher: Streets of Laredo (with Garth Ennis, Punisher # 28–31, tpb, Volume 5, 168 pages, 2003)
Nick Fury, Agent of S.H.I.E.L.D. # 11: "Greeting from Scotland"

Notes

References

Cam Kennedy at Barney

External links
Kenny Who? Cam Kennedy Art - Official website.

Scottish comics artists
Year of birth missing (living people)
Living people